Brinda Gopal know professionally is Brinda, is an Indian dance choreographer who primarily works in South Indian cinema. She has choreographed dance sequences for various Indian films. She has won one National Film Award for Best Choreography, Tamil Nadu State Film Award for Best Choreographer, twice and Kerala State Film Award for Best Choreography, four times.

Early life
Brindha was born into a family of seven girls to Mani Iyer, a caterer, and a homemaker in Erode. An elder sister Jayanthi, first started dancing and acted as heroine in two films – Uthiripookkal and Poottatha Pookkal. Brindha's second sister Girija, learned Bharatanatyam at Kalakshetra; and went to work with choreographers Thangam and later Raghuram Master, whom she married later, and also become an independent choreographer. Kala, a leading choreographer, is her youngest sister.

One of her nephews, Prasanna Sujit, is also a film choreographer. One of her niece Gayathri Raghuram, daughter of late Raghuram Master and her sister Girija is also a choreographer and an actress. She has also introduced her another niece Keerthi, daughter of Jayanthi Master and wife of actor Shanthanu Baghyaraj, as an anchor in her dance reality show Maanada Mayilada.

Career
Through the Bollywood film Insaf Ki Pukar she started her career as an assistant choreographer in 1987.She became independent choreographer with the 2000 Tamil film Mugavaree which features Ajith Kumar and Jyothika in lead roles. She was awarded the 'Tamil Nadu State Film Award for Best Choreographer by the state government at Tamil Nadu State Film Awards in 2000 for her work for that film.

Selected filmography

Awards and honours

See also
 Indian women in dance

References

External links
 

Indian film choreographers
Living people
Year of birth missing (living people)
Indian women choreographers
Indian female dancers
Dancers from Tamil Nadu
Women artists from Tamil Nadu
Indian choreographers
Best Choreography National Film Award winners